John Aitchison (1926–2016) was a Scottish statistician.

John or Jack Aitchison may also refer to:

 John Aitchison (cricketer) (1928–2009), English cricketer
 John Aitchison (British Army officer) (1779–1875)
 Jack Aitchison (born 2000), Scottish footballer 
 Jack Aitchison (Australian footballer) (1911–1976), Australian rules footballer
 Jack Aitchison, candidate in Midlothian Council election, 2007 and 2012

See also
 Craigie Aitchison (painter) (John Ronald Craigie Aitchison, 1926–2009), Scottish painter